Friedrich Gustav Schlick (1804–1869) was German painter and engraver.

1804 births
1869 deaths
German engravers
19th-century German painters
19th-century German male artists
German male painters